The zenaida doves make up a small genus  (Zenaida) of American doves in the family Columbidae.

The genus was introduced in 1838 by  French naturalist Charles Lucien Bonaparte. The name commemorates his wife, Zénaïde Laetitia Julie Bonaparte, niece of Napoleon Bonaparte. The type species is the Zenaida dove, Zenaida aurita.

Systematics
DNA sequence analysis confirms that the white-winged and West Peruvian doves are the most distinct and that they should be treated as distinct species. Relationships among the other species are quite unequivocal, too; what is not quite clear is whether the Galapagos dove is most closely related to the zenaida dove (as tentatively indicated by morphology) or to the eared and mourning doves (as suggested by DNA sequences — although with a very low confidence level – and, most robustly, biogeography).

Extant species
The genus contains seven species:

See also
Passenger pigeon, a similar-looking extinct species

References

Taxa named by Charles Lucien Bonaparte